USAIC may refer to either:

 United States Army Infantry Center
 United States Army Intelligence Center